Jefferson D. Hughes III (born January 9, 1952) is an American judge who has served as justice of the Supreme Court of Louisiana since 2013.

Early life and education
Hughes graduated Denham Springs High School in 1970. He received a bachelor's degree in history and Juris Doctor from Louisiana State University. He was admitted to the Louisiana Bar in October 1978.

Career
After law school, Hughes clerked for Judge Frank Polozola before entering private practice. In 1990, Hughes was elected district judge for the 21st Judicial District Court. In 2004 he was elected as a judge for the Louisiana Court of Appeal, First Circuit. He served in that capacity until he took his seat as associate justice of the Supreme Court in 2013. In 2018, Hughes was reelected without opposition.

References

External links 

Living people
Louisiana lawyers
Louisiana State University alumni
Louisiana State University Law Center alumni
Louisiana state court judges
Justices of the Louisiana Supreme Court
Louisiana Republicans
Year of birth missing (living people)